Kevin Patrick O'Connor (born 7 May 1995) is an Irish footballer who plays as a full-back for League of Ireland First Division side Cork City.

Club career

Republic of Ireland 
Born in 1995, O'Connor began his career with Waterford United in 2013. In his second season with the club, he scored twice, once in a 3–1 victory against Wexford and another goal in a 1–1 draw against Galway. After trialling with English Championship club Bournemouth, he signed for League of Ireland club Cork City on 28 April 2015. On 31 August 2015, he scored his debut goal for the club in a 3–1 victory over St Patrick's Athletic. On 22 July 2016, he scored the lone goal in a 1–0 victory over Swedish club Häcken in the UEFA Europa League. He volleyed a free kick of Greg Bolger, which entered the goal following a deflection from Häcken defender Emil Wahlstrom. On 6 December 2016, he renewed his contract with the club for the 2017 League of Ireland Premier Division season.

England 
On 30 June 2017, O'Connor signed for English Championship club Preston North End on a three-year deal for an undisclosed fee. On 8 August, he made his debut for the club, featuring in a 3–2 defeat against League Two club Accrington Stanley in the EFL Cup. He made his league debut in a 2–0 defeat against Aston Villa in November. He received praise of club manager Alex Neil for his performance.

In 2018, O'Connor had a loan spell at Fleetwood Town, making five first team appearances. In August 2018, he was signed on loan by Crewe Alexandra until January 2019, making his Crewe debut in a 3-0 home win over Macclesfield Town.

Style of play 
Cork City manager John Caulfield has described O'Connor as a "strong, quick, left-footed" player. O'Connor has said that although he is a full back, he prefers playing as an attacking full-back.

Personal 
O'Connor won €1,000,000 in the Irish National Lottery's 2017 Christmas Millionaire Raffle, with a ticket bought as a Christmas present by his uncle.

Career statistics

Club

References

External links 

1995 births
Living people
Association football defenders
Republic of Ireland association footballers
People from Enniscorthy
Waterford F.C. players
Cork City F.C. players
Shelbourne F.C. players
Preston North End F.C. players
Fleetwood Town F.C. players
League of Ireland players
Irish expatriate association footballers
Republic of Ireland youth international footballers
Lottery winners
Crewe Alexandra F.C. players
Irish expatriate sportspeople in England